The 2024 NHL Winter Classic is an upcoming outdoor regular season National Hockey League (NHL) game, part of the Winter Classic series. The game is scheduled for January 1, 2024, with the Seattle Kraken hosting the Vegas Golden Knights at T-Mobile Park, in a battle between the league's two youngest expansion teams.

Background
The league announced the game on January 2, 2023, before the start of the previous season's Winter Classic. This would be the first Winter Classic held in the Pacific Time Zone, as well as Seattle's first outdoor game. Vegas previously appeared in the 2021 NHL Outdoors at Lake Tahoe.

References

NHL Winter Classic
NHL Winter Classic, 2024
Winter Classic
NHL Winter Classic
Seattle Kraken games
Vegas Golden Knights games
Ice hockey in Seattle
Sports competitions in Seattle